Nathan Chinenye Okechukwu Kanu is an Anglican bishop in Nigeria: he is the current Bishop of Aba Ngwa North, one of nine within the Anglican Province of Aba, itself one of 14 provinces within the Church of Nigeria.

Kanu was born on 7 March 1966 in Obegu. He was educated  at Mgboko Umuanunu School and Trinity Theological College, Umuahia. He was ordained in 1995. He served  at Eziukwu Aba and Amano in Abia State. He then continued his ministry in Oklahoma and California. In 2007 Kanu was elected a Suffragan Bishop of the Convocation of Anglicans in North America. In 2009 he was translated to Aba Ngwa North, after the death of the pioneer bishop John Ezirim. 

In 2022, after Felix Orji left the Church of Nigeria North American Mission for the Anglican Church in North America, Kanu was appointed interim coordinating bishop of CONNAM.

Notes

Living people
1966 births
People from Abia State
Trinity Theological College, Umuahia alumni
Anglican bishops of Aba Ngwa North
21st-century Anglican bishops in Nigeria